Allen Bukoff (born June 20, 1951) is an artist and social psychologist in Bloomfield Hills, Michigan. He received his Ph.D. from Kent State University in 1984. Bukoff has belonged to the Fluxus art movement since the 1980s. He was one of the original founders of the Fluxlist, an online community of Fluxus artists and writers launched in 1996, along with other Fluxus artists Dick Higgins, Ken Friedman, Owen Smith, Joe De Marco and Jon Van Oast.

Bukoff's work is in several collections and appears on numerous websites and online collaborations.

External links
 Allen Bukoff
 Fluxus Midwest

1951 births
Living people
American artists
Fluxus
Kent State University alumni
People from Bloomfield Hills, Michigan
Artists from Michigan